Marijo Moćić (born 4 May 1989) is a Slovenian football midfielder.

External links
Player profile at PrvaLiga 
Player profile at Nogomania 

Living people
1989 births
Sportspeople from Celje
Slovenian footballers
Association football midfielders
NK Celje players
Slovenian PrvaLiga players
Slovenia under-21 international footballers